Gypsochares baptodactylus is a moth of the family Pterophoridae that can be found in Italy, Sardinia, Corsica, Slovenia and Croatia.

The larvae possibly feed on Helichrysum italicum.

References

Oidaematophorini
Moths described in 1850
Moths of Europe
Taxa named by Philipp Christoph Zeller